Halymeniales is an order of red algae belonging to the class Florideophyceae and the subclass Rhodymeniophycidae.

The type species is Halymenia .

The red algae colour comes from photosynthetic pigments (phycoerythrin, phycocyanin, allophycocyanin). Then the various blends of relative amounts of these 3 and chlorophyll, influences the plant colour, which can vary from dark red to blue, brown, or greenish.

History
In 1996, Saunders and Kraft recognized a new name, the Halymeniales, for the red algal order that was previously known as the Cryptonemiales , based on small-subunit rRNA phylogenetic analyses. The adapted order of Halymeniales originally held the families of Halymeniaceae  and Sebdeniaceae , and it was characterized by taxa with a multi-axial thallus, non-procarpic female reproductive development, outwardly directed carpogonial branches and intercalary auxiliary cells (Saunders and Kraft, 1996). Later Saunders and Kraft in 2002, transferred the genus Tsengia  from the Nemastomatales order into the Halymeniales with the establishment of the new mono-generic family Tsengiaceae. The Sebdeniaceae family was later removed from the Halymeniales and elevated to a new order, Sebdeniales  (by Withall and Saunders, 2006) as suggested by Gavio et al. (2005). Later, Papenfuss (1955) synonymized the Grateloupiaceae  with the Cryptonemiaceae; however, Guiry (1978) reinstated the Halymeniaceae  based on nomenclatural priority. As a consequence, the Grateloupiaceae and Cryptonemiaceae are now considered synonyms of the Halymeniaceae. After using a taxon-rich rbcL data set, the family Grateloupiaceae was reinstated into the Halymeniales order in 2021.
The Archaeolithophyllaceae  family was created in 1987, and placed within the Corallinales (Order), before being placed within the Halymeniales.

Families
As accepted by AlgaeBase (with nuumber of species per family);
 Archaeolithophyllaceae  - 4 spp.
 Grateloupiaceae  - 116 spp.
 Halymeniaceae  - 227 spp.
 Tsengiaceae  - 12 spp.

WoRMS only accepts Halymeniaceae and Tsengiaceae and not the other 2 families

Distribution
The order has cosmopolitan distribution. They are found in places such as Tasmania (Australia), Brazil, within the Mediterranean, near the island of Madagascar (within the Indian Ocean), the Philippines, Vietnam, the South Korean coast (East and South) and near Japan.

Species notes
Polyopes affinis is a red alga from the order Halymeniales. The species is abundantly found along the South Korean coast (East and South) and also in Japan, and it is widely used as a food in South Korea, Japan, and China because of its nutritional properties and health benefits (Ha et al. 2022).

Also, Halymenia durvillei is a red seaweed with a great potential as sulphated galactan producer.

References

Red algae orders